Sin Vergüenza is the third studio album recorded by Bacilos released on September 28, 2004.  The album won the Latin Grammy Award for Best Pop Album by a Duo or Group with Vocals.

Track listing
This information adapted from Allmusic.

References

2004 albums
Bacilos albums
Spanish-language albums
Latin Grammy Award for Best Pop Album by a Duo or Group with Vocals
Albums produced by Sergio George